= Omotayo Fakinlede =

Omotayo Abayomi Fakinlede
- Born: April 1, 1956; Akure, Ondo State, Nigeria
- Education: University of Lagos; University of Alberta
- Scientific career
- Fields: Computational mechanics, Systems engineering, Engineering education
- Workplaces: University of Lagos, University of Ilorin, Energy Commission of Nigeria

Omotayo Abayomi Fakinlede (born April 1, 1956) is a Nigerian mechanical engineer and academic. He is a professor of computational mechanics in the Department of Systems Engineering at the University of Lagos (UNILAG), where he previously served as Head of Department and Dean of the Faculty of Engineering. He retired from the university on April 1, 2026.

== Early life and education ==
Fakinlede was born on April 1, 1956, in Akure, Ondo State, Nigeria. He attended St. Theresa's Primary School, Akure (1961–1965) and St. Joseph's College, Ondo (1966–1971). He received a Bachelor of Science degree in Mechanical Engineering from the University of Lagos (1973–1977). He earned a Ph.D. in Mechanical Engineering from the University of Alberta, Canada (1980–1985).

== Career ==
Fakinlede began his academic career as a Graduate Assistant at the University of Lagos (1978–1980) and later at the University of Alberta (1980–1984). He served as Lecturer and Senior Lecturer at the University of Ilorin from 1985 to 1998. From 1998 to 2003, he was Head of Computer Systems at the Energy Commission of Nigeria in Abuja.

In 2006, he returned to the University of Lagos as Professor of Computational Mechanics in the Department of Systems Engineering. He later served as Head of the department and as Dean of the Faculty of Engineering.

On March 25, 2026, the University of Lagos Senate honoured him prior to his retirement.

== Research and contributions ==
Fakinlede's research has focused on computational mechanics, particularly compliant mechanisms, large-deformation analysis, composite structures, biomechanics, and fracture mechanics. According to his ResearchGate profile, he has co-authored 20 publications that have received 78 citations. Key works include studies on fatigue failure in polymeric compliant systems, the biomechanics of fibrocystic breasts under finite compressive deformation, and geometrically nonlinear analysis of compliant mechanisms.

He has worked on the development of a synthetic framework linking engineering design to analytical traditions suited to Nigeria's context. He developed MASC, an automated evaluation and testing platform for use in resource-constrained academic environments. This work also led to the creation of a customised Learning Management System for engineering education.

He has been involved in initiatives to promote practical engineering training in West Africa, including the S2PAfrica Engineering Design Competition.

He maintains a personal website, oafak.com, where he shares teaching resources, public comments, and other notes.

== Post-retirement activities ==
In May 2026, during his valedictory lecture, Fakinlede stated that he plans to dedicate part of his retirement to training artisans, with a focus on improving practical skills such as geometric understanding to enhance the quality of locally produced goods. He mentioned working on developing a sustainable business model for this initiative.
